María Paloma Gómez Borrero (18 August 1934 – 24 March 2017) was a Spanish journalist and writer.

Biography
Paloma Gómez Borrero was a descendant, by maternal line, of Juan Álvarez Mendizábal. Her maternal grandfather, had a prominent role with the Isabelino troops during the Carlist Wars. She began her studies at the Deutsche Schule Madrid, and during the summers she had the opportunity to visit France, the United Kingdom, and Germany, thanks to a scholarship program. She spoke five languages.

Gómez Borrero was dismissed from office in 1983 by personal decision of the then director of RTVE, .

She was also a correspondent of Venevisión (Venezuela) and Noticiero TV Hoy (Colombia). From August 2007 to 2012 she wrote for the Telecinco program , presented by Jordi González.

On 15 August 2013, Gómez Borrero planted and nurtured a tree with her name in the Communication Park of Boiro, the only one in Spain created by journalists.

She studied palmistry applied to psychology.

On 12 October 2014 she premiered the recital Una Castellana Vieja y Recia de nombre Teresa in Toledo, along with the baritone Luis Santana and the pianist Antonio López. It portrayed the acts of the 5th Centennial of Saint Teresa of Ávila, running throughout the Teresian Year for more than seventy performances related to the poet.

Gómez Borrero wrote for numerous Spanish media outlets such as TVE, Telemadrid, ABCs Alfa y Omega, and COPE. She had extensive knowledge of the Holy See, and accompanied Pope John Paul II on his 104 trips (5 of them to Spain) visiting 160 countries, some 29 times around the world in kilometers traveled.

I am still in the breach". She also thanked Italy for the prize, "who has been very generous with her," and her family: "they have been my support and much of what I am in this profession I owe to the holy patience of my husband and my children. For times that I have left them eating at the table to go to send a chronicle."

Paloma Gómez Borrero died on 24 March 2017 at age 82 due to liver cancer, which had been diagnosed a few weeks earlier.

Awards
 European Prize of the City Council of Rome (1974)
 Professionalism Prize awarded for coverage of the Papal conclave and for information on the murder of Aldo Moro (1978)
 Calabria Prize, awarded by the President of the Republic to a foreign correspondent in Italy (1980)
 Adelaide Ristori Award to 12 outstanding women in their respective professions (1991)
 Llama Rotaria 97 Award from the Rotary Club of Valencia (1997)
 Cross of the Order of Isabella the Catholic, granted by King Juan Carlos I (12 July 1999)
 Dame of the Order of St. Gregory the Great, granted by Pope John Paul II (13 July 2002)
 Silver Cross of the Spanish Association of European Development (2002)
 Special Bravo Award for exemplary lifetime career, granted by the Episcopal Conference (2010)
 Gold Medal of Merit in Labour (2017; posthumous)

Books
 Huracán Wojtyla
 Abuela, háblame del Papa
 Juan Pablo, amigo
 Adiós, Juan Pablo, amigo
 Dos Papas, una familia
 La Alegría
 A vista de Paloma
 Caminando por Roma
 Los fantasmas de Roma
 Los fantasmas de Italia
 Una guía del viajero para el jubileo
 De Benedicto a Francisco. El cónclave del cambio
 El Libro de la pasta
 Pasta, pizza y mucho más
 Comiendo con Paloma Gómez Borrero
 Cocina sin sal o Nutrición infantil

References

1934 births
2017 deaths
20th-century Spanish writers
21st-century Spanish writers
Dames of St. Gregory the Great
Deaths from cancer in Spain
Deaths from liver cancer
Recipients of the Order of Isabella the Catholic
Spanish journalists
Spanish women journalists
Writers from Madrid